A permanent private hall (PPH) in the University of Oxford is an educational institution within the university. There are five permanent private halls at Oxford, four of which admit undergraduates. They were founded by different Christian denominations. The principal difference between a college and a PPH is that whereas the former are governed by the fellows of the college, the governance of a PPH resides, at least in part, with the corresponding Christian denomination.

Students at PPHs are members of the University of Oxford and have full access to the university's facilities and activities.

Overview
Regent's Park College is the largest PPH, and admits men and women of any age. Blackfriars, St Stephen's House, and Wycliffe Hall were all male-only institutions historically, but all three are now co-educational, training ordinands for their respective denominations, and also admitting students for a range of other courses of study. Campion Hall admits Jesuits and priests of other orders and congregations who are graduate students. It occasionally accepts non-ordained students and ministers of other churches.

History

Private halls

The Oxford University Act 1854 and the university statute De aulis privatis (On private Halls) of 1855, allowed any Master of Arts aged at least 28 years to open a private hall after obtaining a licence to do so. The longest lived of the thirteen private halls was Charsley's Hall (1862–1891). Notable masters of private halls included William Edward Addis and George Butler.

The Universities Tests Act 1871 opened all university degrees and positions to men who were not members of the Church of England (subject to safeguards for religious instruction and worship), which made it possible for Roman Catholics and Nonconformists to open private halls. These non-Anglican private halls included Clarke's Hall (now Campion Hall), opened by the Jesuit Order in 1896, and Hunter Blair's Hall (later St Benet's Hall) opened by the Benedictine Order in 1899.

Permanent private halls
In 1918 the university passed a statute to allow private halls which were not run for profit to become permanent private halls and the two halls took new names.

In some cases, a PPH can be granted full collegiate status; recent examples include Mansfield College (became a full college in 1995) and Harris Manchester College (became a full college in 1996).

Greyfriars (1224; refounded 1910), closed in 2008. St Benet's Hall started admitting women as graduates in 2014 and as undergraduates in 2016. St Benet's closed in 2022.

List of permanent private halls

Former permanent private halls

References

External links 
 Regulations for the Establishment and Maintenance of Permanent Private Halls
 Review of the Permanent Private Halls associated with the University of Oxford

 
Terminology of the University of Oxford